Tunin' Up & Cosignin'  is a two disc set by N'dambi. It is her second effort. It focuses on a more jazzy sound with live instrumentation. The album contains many songs from her debut, re-worked to fit the environment of the album. Tunin' Up & Cosignin' has a few skits with her and her band. It demonstrates, even further, the influence of jazz artist Nina Simone. The first track is a seven-minute-long tribute to her, simply titled, "Ode 2 Nina". N'dambi explores her jazz artistry with scatting, among other things.

Track listing

Disc 1

"Ode 2 Nina"                           
"People"                                   
"... R.C., what was u doing?"              
"Day Dreamer"                              
"Do Mat Mare Ray"                          
"Call Me"                                  
"Bitter Bitter Blue"                      
"Crazy World"                             
"See U In My Dreams"                       
"Y'all ready, fool?"                       
"Hot Pearl C"                              
"Black Star"
"Leave it Just Like That"

Disc 2

"Lonely Woman" / "Eva's Song"
"Soul From the Abyss"
"Soul... Day Dreamer"
"Deep"
"Blueprint 4..."
"Picture This" / "Can This Be Love"
"Lock, Playin' his own shi..."
"I Think 4 Sure"
"What's Wrong With U"
"The Sunshine"
"Broke My Heart"

References

N'dambi albums
2001 albums